Erik Schumann (15 February 1925 – 9 February 2007) was a German actor. He appeared in 100 films and television shows between 1942 and 1997. He was most successful during the 1950s and 1960s, when he played leading roles in several German films.  He starred in the 1964 film Time of the Innocent, which was entered into the 14th Berlin International Film Festival. Schumann also worked as a stage and dubbing-voice actor in German synchronisations. Among his dubbing roles were Tony Curtis in Some Like It Hot, Cary Grant in Bringing Up Baby and Jack Nicholson in Prizzi's Honor. He also performed the German voice of Stinky Pete in Pixar's third feature film Toy Story 2, originally performed by Kelsey Grammer.

Filmography

References

External links

1925 births
2007 deaths
German male film actors
German male television actors
20th-century German male actors
Deaths from cancer in Germany